Telchin licus, the banana stem borer, is a moth of the Castniidae family. It is native to South America, where it is found from Colombia, Venezuela and the Guianas, throughout the Amazon basin in Brazil and Peru. It has also been recorded as an introduced species in Hawaii.

The length of the forewings is 64–80 mm. Adults are dark brown with bluish or greenish hues. There is a whitish-cream transverse band and an apical whitish spotted band on the forewing. The hindwings are dark brown with a whitish-cream band. The spots are red or reddish with the middle spots larger in size.

The larvae feed on Saccharum officinarum, Musa, Heliconia and Ichnosiphon species. It is considered a pest species. Young larvae make a small cavity and then tunnel into the heart of the cane of the host plant. They tunnel upwards and downwards, and create a shelter in the rootstock where they rest. Pupation takes place in the rootstock or at the base of the cane.

Subspecies
Telchin licus licus (Brazil)
Telchin licus albomaculata (Houlbert, 1917) (Colombia, Peru)
Telchin licus chocoensis (Hopp, 1925) (Colombia)
Telchin licus insularis (Houlbert, 1918) (Trinidad)
Telchin licus laura (Druce, 1896) (Brazil)
Telchin licus licoidella (Strand, 1913) (Peru)
Telchin licus pauperata (Strand, 1913) (Surinam, French Guiana, Guyana)
Telchin licus magdalena (Joicey & Talbot, 1925) (Colombia)
Telchin licus microsticta (Rothschild, 1919) (Nicaragua)
Telchin licus rubromaculata (Houlbert, 1917) (Brazil, Bolivia)
Telchin licus talboti (Lathy, 1922) (Ecuador)
Telchin licus vorax Lamas, 1995 (Peru)

References

External links
Castniinae (Lepidoptera: Castniidae) From Venezuela. V: Castnia Fabricius And Telchin Hübner
The Castniinae at the Zoologisches Forschungsmuseum Alexander Koenig, Bonn (Lepidoptera: Castniidae)

Castniidae
Moths of South America